Israel's men's national football team has represented Israel in international football contests since 1930. The team is overseen by the Israel Football Association, the administrative body of Israeli football.

Since its inception, the Israeli team has played in 436 official games (as of November 2010). These games have resulted in 162 wins, 104 draws, and 170 losses. The teams last qualified for either the World Cup or European Championships was in 1970 when the World Cup was held in Mexico.  The team also won the AFC Asian Cup held in Israel in 1964.

Israel is the only team who has played in more than two regional international competitions—Oceania, Asia and Europe. Although Israel belongs to Asia, political tension related to the Arab–Israeli conflict has prevented Muslim and Arab teams from playing against the Israeli national team.  Since 1991, Israel has been part of the UEFA, the European soccer federation.

Pre-State

In June 1928, Sir Alfred Mond, visited Mandate Palestine. Mond was a professional footballer. During his visit, he announced his willingness to fund the establishment of a national squad of 18 players who would travel to games in England, in order to play in the first league. While there had previously been a number of local teams fielded in exhibition games abroad, Mond was the first to propose establishment of a national team.   He met with the heads of "Maccabi" and "HaPoel", the dominant local sports organizations.  Despite the hostilities that existed then between the organizations, it was decided to implement the proposal of Richmond to establish three committees would be responsible for organizing a team.

A tournament was played between the major football clubs at the time: Hapoel Tel Aviv, Maccabi Tel Aviv, Hapoel Haifa and Maccabi Hashmonai Jerusalem. While Hapoel Tel Aviv won the tournament without a single loss, the committee included players from the other teams in the national team. Discipline problems also arose within the group and the organizing committee feared serious discipline problems during the voyage to England. Local criticism and criticism between the two sports unions led to a request from Sir Mond to send a professional coach from England to train the club for competition in England in 1929.

Cairo 1931 games
The Football Association in Israel / Palestine was established on 14 August 1928 and was accepted as a member of FIFA a year later in 1929. The Home Association (now the Israel Football Association) wanted to send a national team to the first World Cup in Uruguay, but because of the boycott imposed by the Association English Football FIFA at the time the order was given by the British government did not allow the team to attend the World Cup.

In April 1930, the team played its first games.  The squad travelled to Cairo for a series of games with Egypt. The delegation to Egypt included six Jews and Arabs - one from Nadi Riad al Arab. These players are considered the first Israeli team.  The first game was held in Cairo on April 10 with a full stadium and the Egyptian team won 5–0.

First game in British Mandate
The team's first game was held in Egypt in 1934 against the Egyptian national football team, which they lost 7–1.

Israel National Football Team in the modern day 

The team has not qualified for the World Cup Finals 2022, as they finished third in their group; behind Scotland and Denmark; in front of Austria, Faroe Islands and Moldova. As of December 2022, they are currently top of UEFA Nations League; League B Group 1.

21st century
After Nielsen, coach Avram Grant was appointed to the team, which failed its first tournament but later managed to improve its image and return the selected game audience. During the 2006 World Cup qualifying, Israel finished unbeaten but failed to qualify to the playoffs because of goal difference.

In 2006 appointed coach Dror Kashtan, who guided the national team in the Euro 2008 qualifying tournament presented a series of victories in the exterior of the groups that are rated below a home victory of Russian team score 2–1, but lost other games and finished the tournament in fourth place, with the same number of points as England. Following the campaign, was Israel's first-ever second rate in Europe and later increased its peak position in the world to 15th place. At the end of the early tournament was decided that Kashtan will continue to guide the national team World Cup 2010 qualifying too. Due to the rise of Israel to rank second quality in Europe, it won the lottery, and this tournament, when the main rivals were supposed to be Greece and Switzerland, along with lower-rated teams, Moldova, Latvia and Luxembourg. However, the result was a culmination in a home loss in team Latvia, destroyed the chances of Israel's first right house.

Balance achievements and failures
One of the games in Israeli official soccer team history was on October 13, 1993, when Israel's national team played against France national team in Park de France stadium in France in 1994 for the World Cup qualifier when France's victory was credited with participation in the World Cup. After the home game against the French team lost to Israel 4–0; Israel won 3–2 and following the loss, France lost the World Cup in favour of immigration that came, and Bulgaria finished the tournament in fourth place.

Other big games are 2:1 victory over Yugoslavia in Belgrade, Rome Olympics qualifier (1960) (Yugoslavia Israel ahead so the only margin goals and won the Olympic silver medal) and victory in October 1981 Portugal 4–1 World Cup qualifier in 1982, with the striker's hat-trick. In 1999, the ballet team victory 5–0 in the Ramat Gan Stadium located in Austria. That Israel's national team qualified for tournament games intersection but was knocked out by Denmark. The team held some great victories, whilst, on the contrary, held some defeats. After some games being refused to be played, FIFA had decided that Israel will have to deal with decisive games against Wales, which lost twice by 0:2.

Until the eighties were completely identical, or nearly complete, the Olympic team and national team were. But failure was the team's Ahaplatah Tokyo Olympics in 1964, following the home loss to South Vietnam. Four years later came to Israel for the first time in the Olympic football tournament, when the team easily won the Ceylon (now Sri Lanka) 7:0 and 4:0 qualified for the Olympics in Mexico (1968) The increased team qualified for the quarterfinals when the Olympic tournament, was eliminated only after a lottery after a 1:1 draw with Bulgaria.

After the 1970 World Cup illegal immigration is a failed attempt to qualify for the house twice e early Asia. Israel qualified for the Olympics in between Montreal (197) and again reached the quarterfinals. 1986 World Cup qualifier is a failed attempt to climb out of the Oceania World Cup, after four years earlier in European Mshsubcah failed. In the 1990 FIFA World Cup qualifying, Israel reached the Oceania playoff game against Colombia, which lost 0–1 and finished in a draw zero out the Ramat Gan Stadium.

1993 to 2010 rating

Since 1993, FIFA rankings are published monthly. The teams rating as of December 2010 is the world's 50th. The highest ranking the team has held was 15th place, in November 2008, under coach Dror Kashtan. The lowest ranking the team has held was 71st place, in September 1993, under the guidance of coach Shlomo Scharf. On average, the team has placed between 25th and 35th.

See also
 Israel national football team

Israel national football team
National
Israel
National football team